The E. M. Fulton House, also known as Glay Williams House and Vernoy Tate House, is a historic home in Wise, Wise County, Virginia. It was built in 1905–1906, and is a -story, six bay, Colonial Revival style frame dwelling clad in a red brick veneer.  It sits on a sandstone foundation and has a hipped and gable roof with dormers. The front facade features a one-story three-bay porch with paired Doric order columns.

It was listed on the National Register of Historic Places in 2005.

See also 
National Register of Historic Places listings in Wise County, Virginia

References

Colonial Revival architecture in Virginia
Houses completed in 1906
Wise, Virginia
Houses in Wise County, Virginia
Houses on the National Register of Historic Places in Virginia
National Register of Historic Places in Wise County, Virginia
1906 establishments in Virginia